Fateh Singh Rao Gaekwad (before April 1751 – 26 December 1789) was the Maharaja of Baroda (r.1778 – 1789). He was the third son of Damaji Rao Gaekwad.

See also
Gaekwad dynasty

References

External links
 Official Website of the Gaekwads of Baroda 

1751 births
1789 deaths
Maharajas of Vadodara
Hindu monarchs
Indian royalty
Indian military leaders